Felix Anton Dohrn FRS FRSE (29 December 1840 – 26 September 1909) was a prominent German Darwinist and the founder and first director of the first zoological research station in the world, the Stazione Zoologica in Naples, Italy. He worked on embryology and examined vertebrate origins in terms of functional phylogeny and proposed a principle of succession of functions in 1875 on how one organ could become the basis for the evolution of another of an entirely different function.

Family history 

Dohrn was born in Stettin (Szczecin), Prussian Province of Pomerania, into a wealthy middle-class family. His grandfather, Heinrich Dohrn, had been a wine and spice merchant, and had made the family fortune by trading in sugar. This wealth allowed Anton's father, Carl August, to devote himself to his various hobbies; travelling, folk music and insects. Anton, the youngest son, read zoology and medicine at various German universities (Königsberg, Bonn, Jena and Berlin). His brother Heinrich Wolfgang Ludwig Dohrn was also a zoologist. pp

In 1874 Dohrn married sixteen-year-old Maria Baranowska, a refugee from Poland whom he had met in Messina. They had four children Boguslaw, Wolfgang, Harald and Reinhard. Due to her linguistic abilities, Maria became a successful translator.

Entomology 

Dohrn was initially interested in Hemiptera. In 1859, he published Beitrag zur Kenntniss der Harpactoridae in Entomologische Zeitung and the more important Catalogus hemipterorum. He gained his doctorate from Breslau in November 1865 with his thesis "On the Anatomy of Hemiptera". At this time, he became associated with the English scientific establishment through his father's friendship with Henry Tibbats Stainton. In 1866, he published a paper on fossil insects Zur Kenntniss der Insecten in den Primärformationen. In this he describes Eugereon boeckingi (Palaeodictyoptera).

Introduction to Darwinism 

His ideas changed in summer 1862 when he returned to study at Jena, where Ernst Haeckel introduced him to Darwin's work and theories. Dohrn became a fervent defender of Darwin's theory of evolution by natural selection.

At that time comparative embryology was the keystone of morphological evolutionary studies, based on Haeckel's recapitulation theory, the idea that an organism during its embryonic development passes through the major stages of the evolutionary past of its species. Morphology became one of the major ways in which zoologists sought to expand and develop Darwinian theory in the latter years of the 19th century. Dohrn chose to become a "Darwinian morphologist".

Dohrn received his doctorate in 1865 at Breslau under Eduard Grube, and his Habilitation in 1868 at Jena with Rudolf Virchow, Ernst Haeckel and Carl Gegenbaur. The study subjects were medicine and zoology, and his Jena monograph was Studien zur Embryologie der Arthropoden. From 1868 to 1870, he was a Docent in zoology at Jena. During these times, he worked several times at facilities located by the sea: Heligoland alongside Haeckel in 1865, Hamburg in 1866, Millport, Scotland with David Robertson in 1867 and 1868 and moved to Messina, Italy, during the winter of 1868 together with his friend and colleague Nicholas Miklouho-Maclay to work on the marine life of the Straits of Messina. In 1870 Dohrn was called up to (briefly) serve in the Franco-Prussian War.

Principle of succession of functions 
Among Dohrn's most highly cited theoretical contributions was his so-called "principle of succession of functions". It was derived from pre-existing ideas, especially those that had been proposed by the comparative anatomist St. George Mivart. Dohrn's ideas on functional phylogenetics underlie some of the embryological hypotheses such as the origin of the vertebrate jaw from gill arches. In his original writings he claimed that gill slits had changed into a variety of vertebrate organs.

Development of "zoological stations" 

From 1850 to 1852, the zoologist and geologist Carl Vogt had lived in Nice where he tried unsuccessfully to enlist support for a marine zoological station (one was later established as Observatoire Oceanologique de Villefranche). In Messina, Dohrn and Miklouho-Maclay conceived a plan to cover the globe with a network of zoological research stations, analogous to railway stations, where scientists could stop, collect material, make observations and conduct experiments, before moving on to the next station.

Dohrn realised how useful it would be for scientists to arrive at a location and find a ready to use laboratory. Dohrn rented two rooms for the "Stazione Zoologica di Messina", but quickly realized the technical difficulties of studying marine life without a permanent structure and support facilities, such as trained personnel and a library.

Foundation of the Stazione Zoologica 

In 1870 Dohrn decided that Naples would be a better place for his Station. This choice was due to the greater biological richness of the Gulf of Naples and also to the possibility of starting a research institute of international importance in a large university town that itself had a strong international element.

After a visiting a newly opened aquarium in Berlin, the Berliner Aquarium Unter den Linden he decided that charging the general public to visit an aquarium might earn the laboratory enough money to pay a salary for a permanent assistant. Naples, with a population of 500,000 inhabitants, was one of the largest and most attractive cities of Europe and also had a considerable flow of tourists (30,000 a year) that could potentially visit the aquarium.

Dohrn overcame the doubts of the city authorities and persuaded them to give him, free-of-charge, a plot of land at the sea edge, in the beautiful Villa Comunale on the condition that he promised to build the Stazione Zoologica at his own expense.

He opened the station to visiting scientists in September 1873, and to the general public in January 1874.

In 1875 Dohrn published Der Ursprung der Wirbelthiere und das Princip des Functionswechsels: Genealogische Skizzen which proposed the "change of function" theory of the origin of vertebrates.

The "Bench" system 

In order to promote the international status of the Stazione and to guarantee its economic and hence political independence and freedom of research, Dohrn introduced a series of innovative measures to finance his project. Firstly, the rental of work and research space (the "Bench system"), for an annual fee universities, governments, scientific institutions, private foundations or individuals could send one scientist to the Stazione for one year where he or she would find available all that was required to conduct research (laboratory space, animal supply, chemicals, an exceptional library and expert staff). He contributed his own library and obtained donations of books from publishers and authors, including Darwin. These facilities were supplied with no strings attached, in the sense that investigators were completely free to pursue their own projects and ideas.

This system worked extremely well, and when Anton Dohrn died in 1909 more than 2,200 scientists from Europe and the United States had worked at Naples and more than 50 tables-per-year had been rented out. It was in fact at Naples that international scientific collaboration in the modern sense was invented, based on quick and free communication of ideas, methods and results.

Legacy 

The success of the Stazione Zoologica, and the new way of thinking and funding research are the main legacies of Dohrn. The model was copied a number of times throughout the world. In 1878 Johns Hopkins University founded the Chesapeake Zoological Laboratory, under the direction of W.K. Brooks. Then, in 1888, the Marine Biological Laboratory was founded at Woods Hole and in 1892 the first laboratory on the west coast, the Hopkins Marine Station, opened in California. In Britain, current marine laboratories that originate from this time include the Dunstaffnage Marine Station (today Scottish Association for Marine Science, 1884), the Gatty Marine Laboratory (University of St Andrews, 1884), the Marine Biological Association of the United Kingdom (Plymouth, 1888), the Dove Marine Laboratory (Newcastle University, 1897), the Fisheries Research Services Marine Laboratory (Aberdeen, 1899), and the Bangor Marine Station (Queen's University of Belfast, 1903).

Dohrn's name has been immortalised in an undersea feature, the Anton Dohrn Seamount, a seamount in the Rockall Trough, to the north-west of the British Isles, which has become known for the great biodiversity which lives on the cold-water coral, Lophelia pertusa, in this region.

The vessel served in the United States Navy as the patrol vessel Anton Dohrn (SP-1086) from 1917 to 1919.

References

Other sources
 Theodor Heuss (in German: 1940) Anton Dohrn in Neapel. Atlantis-Verlag, Berlin; Rainer Wunderlich, Tübingen 1948 and 1962 (Title now: "Anton Dohrn"); in English 1991, transl. by Liselotte Dieckmann, ed. Christiane Gröben Anton Dohrn. A Life for Science Springer, NY  Springer, Berlin 
 Karl Ernst von Baer & Anton Dohrn Correspondence 1993. Ed. Christiane Gröben. Amer Philosophical Society 
 Theodor Boveri 2009: Anton Dohrn (1910) Kessinger 
 Daum, Andreas W. Wissenschaftspopularisierung im 19. Jahrhundert: Bürgerliche Kultur, naturwissenschaftliche Bildung und die deutsche Öffentlichkeit, 1848–1914. Munich: Oldenbourg, 1998, .
 Musgrave, A. 1932 Bibliography of Australian Entomology 1775 - 1930. Sydney
 Semenov-Tjan-Schanskij, A. P. 1909 [Dohrn, F. A.] Revue Russe d'Entomologie 9

External links 

 Stazione Zoologica Anton Dohrn
 Short biography, bibliography, letters and links on digitized sources in the Virtual Laboratory of the Max Planck Institute for the History of Science Via Marine Station.Links to full text of Nunn, Emily. 1883. The Naples Zoological Station, I & II. Science 1: 479-481, 507-510
 Anton Dohrn Café Blog
 DEI ZALF Biographies of Entomologists of the World.
 Stazione Zoologica and the development of embryology
 Groeben
 Darwin Project. Letters to Charles Darwin
 Embryology

1840 births
1909 deaths
Scientists from Szczecin
German marine biologists
German entomologists
People from the Province of Pomerania
University of Bonn alumni
Foreign Members of the Royal Society
Honorary Fellows of the Royal Society of Edinburgh
Marine zoologists
19th-century German zoologists